Reg Pickett (6 January 1927 – 4 November 2012) was an Indian-born English professional footballer. During his career he made over 100 appearances for both Portsmouth F.C. and Ipswich Town in a professional career that spanned from 1949 to 1963.
Pickett had been playing non-league football with Weybridge prior to joining Portsmouth. He was a member of Portsmouth's Football League Championship winning sides in the late 1940s. In 1957 he signed for Ipswich for £5,000 by Sir Alf Ramsey and was made captain. He went on to make 148 appearances for the Suffolk club, scoring four times.
Born in Bareilly in India, Pickett appeared in 26 games in the 1960/61 campaign in which Ipswich won the Second Division but on only three occasions the following year when Town won the Football League championship for the only time in their history.
He then joined Stevenage in June 1963. 
He died in a nursing home in Rowlands Castle, Hampshire, on 4 November 2012, aged 85. He is the first Indian-origin player to feature in a european continental club competition.

References

External links 
Reg Pickett at Pride of Anglia
Reg Picket Profile a Ipswich Town Talk

1927 births
2012 deaths
Portsmouth F.C. players
Ipswich Town F.C. players
Association football midfielders
English footballers
British people in colonial India
People from Rowland's Castle